Fatimah Khatun bint Najm ad-Dīn Abu al-Shukr Ayyub ibn Shādhi ibn Marwān (died 1220), popularly known as Sitt al-Sham, was a second sister of Saladin, probably older than Rabi'a Khatun. She is known for founding Al-Shamiyah al-Kubra Madrasa.

Biography
Born in Damascus, she was the wife of Muhammad ibn Shirkuh of Homs. Some historians are confused regarding her name; they think it to be Zumurrud. His father was called al-Malik al-Afdal as he was a minister with his brother Asad ad-Din Shirkuh in the court of Nur ad-Din Zengi. 

She married Umar ibn Lājīn and gave birth to their first child, Husām al-Dīn ibn Lājīn. Her first husband Umar ibn Lajin died shortly thereafter. Then she married his paternal cousin, Muhammad ibn Shirkuh, who was the ruler of Homs.

References

1220 deaths
Year of birth unknown
13th-century Muslims
Kurdish Sunni Muslims
People from the Ayyubid Sultanate
13th-century Kurdish people